Christian Andreas Fassnacht (born 11 November 1993) is a Swiss professional footballer who plays as a winger for Swiss Super League club Young Boys and the Switzerland national team.

Club career
Fassnacht was part of the Young Boys squad that won the 2017–18 Swiss Super League, their first league title in 32 years. He played an important role for the club during the title winning season, scoring 11 league goals.

On 3 October 2019, Fassnacht scored a late goal deep into second-half stoppage time to give Young Boys a 2–1 home win over Rangers in the Europa League group stage. On 25 February 2021, he scored in Young Boys' 2–0 second-leg victory over Bayer Leverkusen in the Europa League Round of 32, securing passage into the Round of 16 for the first time in club history.

International career
Fassnacht made his debut with the Switzerland national team (he never represented Switzerland before at any level) in a 2–1 away loss against Belgium. In 2021 he was called up to the national team for the 2020 UEFA European Championship, where the team created one of the main sensations of the tournament reaching the quarter-finals.

Career statistics

Club

International
Scores and results list Switzerland's goal tally first, score column indicates score after each Fassnacht goal.

Honours
Young Boys
 Swiss Super League: 2017–18, 2018–19, 2019–20, 2020–21
 Swiss Cup: 2019–20

References

1993 births
Living people
Footballers from Zürich
Swiss men's footballers
Association football wingers
Switzerland international footballers
UEFA Euro 2020 players
2022 FIFA World Cup players
Swiss Super League players
Swiss Challenge League players
FC Tuggen players
FC Winterthur players
FC Thun players
BSC Young Boys players